Mitzpe Yeriho, also spelled Mitzpeh Yericho (lit. Jericho Lookout), is a religious Israeli settlement in the West Bank. Located 20 km east of Jerusalem and 10 km east of Ma'ale Adummim along Highway 1 in the Judean desert, it is organised as a community settlement and falls under the jurisdiction of Mateh Binyamin Regional Council.

The international community considers Israeli settlements in the West Bank illegal under international law, but the Israeli government disputes this.

Geography
The village lies on one of the last cliffs marking the edge of the Judean highlands, and overlooks the Jordan Rift Valley, the Dead Sea, and the ancient city of Jericho whence its name is derived. The climate is dry, with temperatures a few degrees warmer than Jerusalem temperatures all year round.

History

Founded in October 1977 during the Jewish holiday of Sukkot, it was supposed to be located on government lands adjacent to Jericho. Due to the objection of then Defense Minister Ezer Weizman, they were moved to Mishor Adumim. Agriculture Minister Ariel Sharon suggested a few days later that they relocate to a barren hilltop overlooking Jericho, its current location.

According to ARIJ, in 1978 Israel confiscated 968 dunams of land from the Palestinian site of Nabi Musa in order to construct Mitzpe Yeriho.

The original residents were a mixed group of both religiously observant and non-observant Jews. They later split up into two groups, and the non-observant members established a new settlement, Vered Yericho, located in the Jordan Valley below Mitzpe Yeriho and closer to Jericho.  Still, Mitzpe Yeriho is a community of various traditions and observance levels.  While the main synagogue follows Ashkenazi traditions, there are also two Sephardi synagogues, a Chabad synagogue, a Yemenite synagogue, a Carlebach minyan and several other small functioning minyanim.

In 1982, the community appointed then 27-year-old Yehuda Kroizer as community rabbi. Rabbi Kroizer gives regular classes, both in the town as well as in the Yeshivat HaRaayon HaYehudi, the former yeshiva of Rabbi Meir Kahane.

The yeshiva Netivot Yoseph, a leading Religious Zionist yeshiva headed by Rabbi Shabtai Sabbato, was founded in 1990, and moved the following year to Mitzpe Yeriho. The yeshiva is well known for its emphasis on breadth of Talmudic studies (bekiyut). It frequently honors students who have completed studying the entire Talmud; in 2011, there was a special celebration of 100 graduates who completed Shas. In 2018, the yeshiva opened a Beth Din, a rabbinical court for questions of financial laws. Graduates of the yeshiva who have passed the rabbinate's dayanut exams will serve as judges.

In May 1997, the Israeli Defense Forces dismantled two illegally placed mobile homes in Mitzpe Yeriho.

Demographics
In 2009, the population of Mitzpe Yeriho grew at an annual rate of 5.6%. As of 2010, over 450 families reside in Mitzpe Yeriho.

Environment
In 1999, Mitzpe Yeriho was found to be a "radon-prone" area.  Such an area is defined as one in which the radon concentration is more than 10 times the national average in more than one percent of the homes in the area.

Economy
The community is home to several businesses including an electronics facility, and also serves tourism in the nearby Wadi Qelt nature reserve and its Byzantine-era Saint George Monastery and Hasmonean-era Kypros fortress. It also hosts the Nof Harden wedding hall.

References

External links
Community website
Binyamin Regional Council information page for Mitzpe Yericho
Yeshivat Netivot Yoseph website
Nefesh B' Nefesh Community Profiles - Mitzpe Yericho
American Friends of Mitzpe Yeriho

Populated places established in 1977
Religious Israeli settlements
Mateh Binyamin Regional Council
1977 establishments in the Israeli Military Governorate
Community settlements
Judaean Desert
Israeli settlements in the West Bank